Koban may refer to:
 , Japanese neighborhood police substation, sometimes called a "police box"
 , a former Japanese oval gold coin
 Koban culture, a Central North Caucasian culture circa 1100 to 400 BC